Robert Harris (September 5, 1768September 3, 1851) was a member of the U.S. House of Representatives from Pennsylvania.

Biography
Robert Harris (cousin of John Harris) was born at Harris Ferry in the Province of Pennsylvania (now known as Harrisburg).  He assisted in establishing various enterprises, including building of the bridge over the Susquehanna River, the organization of the Harrisburg Bank, and the construction of the Middletown Turnpike Road.  He was the surveyor to lay off the road from Chambersburg to Pittsburgh, and also for improving the Susquehanna River.  He was appointed commissioner to choose the location of the capitol building in Harrisburg.  he was a paymaster in the Army during the War of 1812.

Harris was elected as a Jackson Republican to the Eighteenth Congress and reelected as a Jacksonian to the Nineteenth Congress.  He served as prothonotary of Dauphin County, Pennsylvania, and died in Harrisburg in 1851.  Interment in Harrisburg Cemetery.

Sources

The Political Graveyard

External links

American surveyors
Politicians from Harrisburg, Pennsylvania
1768 births
1851 deaths
Burials at Harrisburg Cemetery
Democratic-Republican Party members of the United States House of Representatives from Pennsylvania
Jacksonian members of the United States House of Representatives from Pennsylvania
19th-century American politicians